Sarsfield is a surname of Norman origin that may refer to:

People with the surname
Catalina Sarsfield (18th century), Franco-Irish Jacobite and wife of Theodore of Corsica
Dalmacio Vélez Sársfield (1800–1875), Argentine leader
David Sarsfield (died 1710), Irish Jacobite
Emily Sarsfield (born 1983), English freestyle skier
Eugene S. Sarsfield (1902–1943), US Navy
Francis Sarsfield (17th century), Irish lawyer of the 17th century
James Sarsfield, 2nd Earl of Lucan (1693-1718), Franco-Irish Jacobite
Mairuth Sarsfield (1925–2013), author
Patrick Sarsfield, 1st Earl of Lucan (c. 1660–1693), Irish Jacobite leader
Pedro Sarsfield (died 1837), Spanish general of the Peninsular War and First Carlist War
Peter Sarsfield (17th century), Irish landowner
William Sarsfield (16th century), Irish public official
William Sarsfield (died 1675), Irish landowner

Places
Vélez Sársfield (barrio), Buenos Aires
Sarsfield Barracks, Limerick City, Ireland
Sarsfield, Ontario, Canada
Sarsfield, East Gippsland, County of Dargo, Victoria, Australia

Sports clubs

GAA in Ireland
Gaelic Athletic Associations in the island of Ireland named after Patrick Sarsfield, 1st Earl of Lucan:
 High Moss Sarsfields GFC, County Armagh
 Sarsfields GAA (Cork)
 Ballerin GAC, County Derry
 Lucan Sarsfields GAA, County Dublin
 Sarsfields GAA (County Galway)
 Sarsfields GAA (Newbridge), County Kildare
 Thurles Sarsfields GAA, County Tipperary
 Patrick Sarsfields GAA, Belfast (Antrim)

Soccer
Club Atlético Vélez Sarsfield, Buenos Aires, Argentina

Other
USS Sarsfield (DD-837)
Viscount Sarsfield, a title